Rogatica is a town and municipality located in eastern Republika Srpska, an entity of Bosnia and Herzegovina. As of 2013, it has a population of 10,723 inhabitants, while the town of Rogatica  has a population of 6,855 inhabitants.

History
From October 1941 until January 1942, Serbian Chetniks killed around 2,000 Muslim civilians from the Rogatica district.

In 1942, the Croatian fascist Ustaše regime slaughtered about 6,000 Serbs in Stari Brod near Rogatica and Miloševići.

In 1990’s all of the majority Bosniak population was forces to flee due to Serb forces conducting an ethnic cleaning campaign with many Bosniaks raped and killed.

Demographics

Population

Ethnic composition

Economy
The following table gives a preview of total number of registered people employed in legal entities per their core activity (as of 2018):

Notable people
Kemal Mešić, athlete
 Muhamed Mustafić, handball player
 Ibrahim Šehić, football goalkeeper
 Mersad Selimbegović, football player
 Nezir Škaljić, third mayor of Sarajevo (1899–1905)
 Safet Zec, painter

Gallery

References

External links

 

 
Populated places in Rogatica
Cities and towns in Republika Srpska
Glasinac plateau